Batočina is a town and municipality located in the Šumadija District of central Serbia. According to 2011 census, the population of the town is 5,804, while population of the municipality is 11,760.

Settlements
Aside from the town of Batočina, the municipality includes the following settlements:

Demographics

Economy
The following table gives a preview of total number of employed people per their core activity (as of 2017):

References

External links

 

 
Populated places in Šumadija District
Municipalities and cities of Šumadija and Western Serbia